The Mitropa Rally Cup is the oldest rally racing competition in Europe. It is an international annual car racing event termed the "European Championship for Non-Professional Drivers”.  Established in 1965, drivers participate in races in several countries collecting points to determine the cup winner. The series is organised by the Deutscher Motor Sport Bund and takes place in countries all across Europe mainly in Italy, Croatia, Austria, Slovenia and Hungary. The point score system is loaded so that drivers have the potential to score more points in rallies held in nations more distant from their home country making them able to score more points in rallies they are less likely to be familiar with it. The championship is frequently held over six to eight events. In 2023, 9 races are set to be held with a special stop in Switzerland. The historic Rally du Valais will close the 2023 season with its classic, well-known stages.

The series has been dominated by German and Italian drivers. The most successful driver in the series history is German driver Hermann Gassner Sr. who has won the title seven times between 2001 and 2022, all while driving Mitsubishi Lancers. Another German driver, Matthias Moosleitner won the title six times between 1984 and 2000.

The event is not to be confused with the Mitropa Cup, a soccer competition.

Champions
Sourced in part from:

References

External links
Homepage

Rally racing series
Motorsport in Europe